Kirill may refer to:

 Kirill, a male given name
 Kirill (Gundyaev), a Russian Orthodox bishop
 Kirill (web series), an online science fiction drama

See also 
 Kyrill (disambiguation)